A Central Committee of the League of Communists of Yugoslavia was elected by the 13th Congress, and was in session from 1986 until 1990.

Members

Listed in alphabetical order:
 Mato Andrić
 Miloš Bajčetić
 Šućro Bandić
 Dimitrije Baucal
 Ivan Brigić
 Stane Brovet
 Josip Bukovčan
 Radoslav Bulajić
 Seniha Bulja
 Simeon Bunčić
 Tomo Cerjan
 Darja Colarič
 Nurhan Ćato
 Dušan Čkrebić
 Dušica Danilović
 Ladislav Daraboš
 Teza Dimić
 Dimitar Dimidžievski
 Suzana Dinevska
 Raif Dizdarević
 Stane Dolanc
 Svetislav Dolašević
 Dušan Dragosavac
 Ivo Družić
 Enver Đerdeku
 Dalij Đonlagić
 Milo Đukanović
 Mladen Đurin
 Josip Eterović
 Anđelija Filipović
 Slobodan Filipović
 Vangel Gagačev
 Radiša Gačić
 Milan Gorjanc
 Miomir Grbović
 Božidar Grubišić
 Gojko Hajduković
 Sinan Hasani
 Vinko Hafner
 Vladimir Hodaj
 Ahmet Hodžić
 Hrvoje Ištuk 
 Branko Jerčinović
 Lambe Jovanoski
 Nerandža Jovanov
 Radovan Jovanov
 Nikola Jovanović
 Vjekoslav Juričić
 Ivo Karamarko
 Milka Kiković
 Vojislav Knežević
 Anđelko Kovačević
 Rudi Kolak
 Martina Kolar
 Stevan Korošec
 Dragutin Kosovac
 Radoje Kostadinović
 Sergej Kraigher
 Adem Krasnići
 Dara Krnetić
 Antun Kruljac
 Boško Krunić
 Muhiba Kulović
 Dragana Labus
 Branko Lađević
 Mihailo Lalić
 Marko Lolić
 Vukašin Lončar
 Anton Lukežić
 Nandor Major
 Mladenko Maksimović
 Branko Mamula
 Ante Marković
 Krste Markovski
 Petar Matić
 Suljo Mehić
 Ahmet Mehović
 Esad Merdić
 Munir Mesihović
 Branko Mikulić
 Mihajlo Milojević
 Stevan Mirković
 Blagoja Mitanovski
 Vukašin Mićunović
 Ivan Mihaljev
 Lazar Mojsov
 Rahman Morina
 Boris Mužević
 Said Mujkanović
 Đuro Nemet
 Branka Obrenić
 Borislav Odadžić
 Milica Ozbič
 Marko Orlandić
 Marjan Orožen
 Tosum Pahumi
 Jovo Panajotović
 Milan Pančevski
 Milica Pejanović
 Marica Petrović
 Mihajlo Pešić
 Milka Planinc
 Jordan Pop-Jordanov
 Hamdija Pozderac
 Milovan Popović
 Trajko Prendžov
 Tomislav Radović
 Radovan Radonjić
 Ivica Račan
 Milanko Renovica
 Hašim Redžepi
 Bogoljub Redžić
 Stevan Santo
 Zorka Sekulović
 Maksimilijan Senica
 Branislav Simić
 Dobrivoje Simonović
 Jože Slokar
 Andrej Spasov
 Borisav Srebrić
 Boris Stankovski
 Ivan Stojanović
 Nikola Stojanović
 Stanislav Stojanović
 Ali Šabani
 Franc Šetinc
 Petar Šimić
 Kolj Široka
 Franc Šifkovič
 Drago Šofranac
 Stipe Šuvar
 Borut Šuklje 
 Ali Shukriu
 Taip Taipi
 Dragan Tomić
 Stanko Tomić
 Nedelko Trajkovski
 Bogdan Trifunović
 Vasil Tupurkovski
 Uglješa Uzelac
 Igor Uršič
 Ljubomir Varošlija
 Matija Vaslović
 Sanije Veselji
 Dobrivoje Vidić
 Radovan Vlajković
 Josip Vrhovec
 Milutin Vukašinović
 Perko Vukotić
 Mlađen Vuković
 Vidoje Žarković
 Janez Zahrastnik
 Janez Zemljarič
 Dragica Zagrebec
 Snežana Zlatar
 Janko Zupančić

Bibliography

Trinaesti kongres kongres SKJ: referat, rezoilucije, Statut SKJ, završna riječ, sastav organa SKJ; Oslobođenje, Sarajevo, 1986

League of Communists of Yugoslavia